Ion Moraru (9 March 1929 – 9 October 2019) was a Moldovan activist and author. He was a founder of the anti-Soviet group Sabia Dreptății and a political prisoner in the Soviet Union.

Biography 
Moraru was born in Mîndîc. Ion Moraru and Petre Lungu were the founders of Sabia Dreptății in Bălți. This anti-Soviet armed resistance group was active in Bălți during the Stalinist era. "Sabia Dreptății" was discovered by the NKVD in 1947, based at the Pedagogical Lycée (former Ion Creangă Lycée) in Bălţi. For one year, Ion Moraru was imprisoned in the same camp at Ekibastuz with Aleksandr Solzhenitsyn.

Ion Moraru later became a well-known anti-communist in Bessarabia (now the Republic of Moldova).

He was a member of the Christian-Democratic People's Party (Moldova).

Works
 Pustiirea, 2005
 Treptele infernului, 2007

Bibliography
 Elena Postică, "Sabia dreptăţii", în Ţara, 1995, 19, 26 ianuarie

References

External links 
 Moş Ion de la Mândâc a împlinit 80
 Fostul deţinut politic Ion Moraru din satul Mândâc a lansat al doilea volum de memorii
 Organizatia anti-sovietica "Sabia Dreptatii"
 La Chisinau a fost lansata ieri cartea lui Ion Moraru "Pustiirea" 

1929 births
2019 deaths
People from Drochia District
Popular Front of Moldova politicians
Moldovan activists
Moldovan anti-communists
History of Bălți
Christian writers
Prison writings
Moldovan writers
Moldovan male writers
Moldovan prisoners and detainees
Soviet dissidents
Soviet prisoners and detainees